John L. Merkt (October 2, 1946 – April 1, 2009) was an American politician.
Merkt served as local ward committeeman from 1974 to 1976. He was elected to the Wisconsin State Assembly in 1976 and served until 1988.

Biography
John L. Merkt was born in Milwaukee, Wisconsin. He was a graduate of Marquette University High School. He attended Marquette University from 1964 to 1968 and graduated with a Bachelor of Science degree in secondary education, from the University of Wisconsin–La Crosse in 1971.

Career
John Merkt was elected to the Wisconsin State Assembly in 1976 and served for over a decade.
In 1995, in collaboration with then State Representative, State Supreme Court Justice David Prosser Jr. and Wisconsin Governor Tommy Thompson, John Merkt helped push the creation of Miller Park in Milwaukee.

Among his other efforts, Merkt worked to toughen seatbelt legislation and raise the minimum drinking age, from 18 to 19, and later to 21. He also worked to tighten laws and penalties regarding the sale or possession of drugs, especially cocaine; including tripling the mandatory sentence from 12 months' incarceration to 36 months' incarceration for those found guilty of possession or sales of cocaine within  of a school zone. He also wrote Wisconsin's Len Bias Law, which makes providing drugs that prove fatal to be considered manslaughter.

Death
A longtime sufferer of lupus, Merkt died of congestive heart failure at his home on April 1, 2009.

References

Republican Party members of the Wisconsin State Assembly
Politicians from Milwaukee
Marquette University alumni
University of Wisconsin–La Crosse alumni
1946 births
2009 deaths
20th-century American politicians
Marquette University High School alumni